Mervyn Thomas Loch Wickham (31 January 1914 – 16 March 1982) was an Australian rules footballer who played with Hawthorn in the Victorian Football League (VFL).

Notes

External links 

1914 births
1982 deaths
Australian rules footballers from Victoria (Australia)
Hawthorn Football Club players